Tan Sri Datuk Tiong Hiew King  (Hokchew Romanized: Diŏng Hiēu-kĭng; born 1935) is the Malaysian Chinese founder and chairman of the Rimbunan Hijau Group, a timber company founded in 1975. Its overseas timber operations in Papua New Guinea is the largest in that country. He also has interests in logging operations in Russia.

Tan Sri Datuk Tiong resides in Sibu, a town in Sarawak, of Borneo island that is part of Malaysia. , with a net worth of about US$1.1 billion, Tiong is ranked by Forbes as the 1,999th richest person in the world. In April 2017, Tiong’s family confirmed that he was hospitalized after suffering a stroke.

Family
Tiong's family is the second largest private landowner in New Zealand.

Influence in media

Tiong's Rimbunan Hijau Group operates Sin Chew Daily and Guang Ming Daily, two of the major Chinese national dailies in Malaysia. They also operate The National Daily in Papua New Guinea and Ming Pao Holdings Ltd in Hong Kong. He is forging a global Chinese publishing group with his Ming Pao Enterprises; Ming Pao newspaper is also available in San Francisco, New York, Vancouver and Toronto.

Media Chinese International Limited (MCIL) is the holding company for all Tiong’s media assets formed after the merger of Ming Pao Enterprise Corporation Limited, Sin Chew Media Corporation Berhad and Nanyang Press Holdings Berhad.

In 2018, Tiong stepped down from the position of executive chairman of MCIL to take up a non-executive, non-independent directorship in the group.

Influence in local politics

Back home in Sibu, Tiong and his family are members of the ruling Sarawak United People's Party (SUPP), a major party of the ruling coalition government in Sarawak. Tiong's younger brother Tiong Thai King has been the Member of Parliament of the Lanang Parliamentary Constituency in Sibu from 1995 to 2013.

Knighthood controversy
In 2009, Tiong was declared an honorary Knight Commander of the Order of the British Empire (KBE). Following his knighting Environmental groups around the world called for him to be stripped of his title, claiming that his success was built on the destruction of tropical forests by his company, Rimbunan Hijau.

Honours

Honours of Malaysia
  :
  Commander of the Order of Loyalty to the Crown of Malaysia (PSM) - Tan Sri (1999)

  :
  Commander of the Order of the Star of Hornbill Sarawak (PGBK) - Datuk (1990)

Foreign honours
  :
  Order of the British Empire (KBE)

References

External links
Being well connected goes a long way in Malaysia – Malaysia Today: MT-News

Honorary Knights Commander of the Order of the British Empire
Living people
People from Sarawak
Malaysian businesspeople
Malaysian people of Chinese descent
Malaysian billionaires
1935 births
Hong Kong newspaper people
Members of the Dewan Negara
Sarawak United Peoples' Party politicians
Commanders of the Order of the Star of Hornbill Sarawak
Commanders of the Order of Loyalty to the Crown of Malaysia